SEARCA or the Southeast Asian Regional Center for Graduate Study and Research in Agriculture is one of the oldest among 26 specialist institutions of the Southeast Asian Ministers of Education Organization (SEAMEO). Founded on 27 November 1966, SEARCA is mandated to strengthen institutional capacities in agricultural and rural development in Southeast Asia.
 
For its 11th Five-Year Plan (FY 2020/2021- FY 2024/2025), SEARCA commits to accelerate transformation that elevates the quality of life of agricultural families through sustainable livelihoods and access to modern networks and innovative markets.  Transformation efforts will focus on policy, institutional, social and technological innovations. Specifically, the Center’s priority areas will be: (1) Agri-Business Models for Increased Productivity and Income; (2) Sustainable Farming Systems and Natural Resource Management; (3) Food and Nutrition Security; (4) Transformational Leadership for ARD; (5)
Gender and Youth Engagement in ARD; (6) Enhanced ARD towards Climate Resilience; and (7) EcoHealh/One Health Applications to ARD.

SEARCA serves the 11 SEAMEO member countries, namely: Brunei Darussalam, Cambodia, Indonesia, Lao People's Democratic Republic, Malaysia, Myanmar, the Philippines, Singapore, Thailand, Vietnam, and Timor-Leste. The Center is hosted by the Government of the Philippines on the campus of the  University of the Philippines Los Baños (UPLB) in Laguna, Philippines.

Historical milestones 

In July 2020, SEARCA launched its 11th Five-Year Plan focused on Accelerating Transformation Through Agricultural Innovation (ATTAIN).

Core programs 

For more than 50 years, SEARCA has carried out its mandate to strengthen capacities of institutions working toward agricultural and rural development in Southeast Asia. To articulate its 11th FYP, SEARCA has repositioned its products and services based on the needs of its stakeholder groups in support of their efforts to create more impact at the ground level.

References

External links 

SEARCA 11th Five-Year Plan

Research institutes in the Philippines
Organizations based in Laguna (province)
Los Baños, Laguna
Organizations established in 1966
1966 establishments in the Philippines